Postia leucomallella is a species of fungus belonging to the family Fomitopsidaceae.

It has cosmopolitan distribution.

References

Fomitopsidaceae